Pensacola Catholic High School is a private, Roman Catholic, co-educational high school in Pensacola, Florida, United States. It was established in the year 1941 and is located in the Roman Catholic Diocese of Pensacola-Tallahassee.

History 

Pensacola Catholic High School is a Roman Catholic diocesan high school owned and operated by the Diocese of Pensacola-Tallahassee. Catholic High was opened in the Fall of 1941 when the former St. Michael's High School, located on the corner of Garden and Baylen Streets, was renamed as it gained students from several smaller Catholic schools in the city and became the one central Catholic High School in Pensacola. It opened its doors to 180 students. In 1958, Pensacola Catholic High School relocated to its current site in West Pensacola. Through the years, the campus has undergone numerous additions and renovations to accommodate its growing enrollment. The Brent Media Center was built in 2001 and the Science wing was completely remodeled in 2003. In 2004, the renovation of the administration wing was completed.

In 1993, Pensacola Catholic High School was named a Blue Ribbon School of Excellence by the U.S. Department of Education. This honor is granted to outstanding public and private schools across the United States that achieve high academic standards and model excellence.

Pensacola Catholic High School has been continuously accredited by The Southern Association of Colleges and Schools since 1928.

Notable alumni 

 Jon Akin, former professional soccer player for the Atlanta Silverbacks and Kilkinney City, Head Men's and Women's Soccer Coach of Oglethorpe University.
 Jeff Farnsworth, Major League Baseball player for the Detroit Tigers.
 Ashton Hayward, mayor of Pensacola
 Phil Hiatt, Major League baseball player for the Kansas City Royals, Detroit Tigers, and Los Angeles Dodgers.
 Billy Sadler, relief pitcher for the San Francisco Giants.
 Joe Scarborough, U.S. congressman (1995–2001) and television personality.
 Josh Sitton, right guard for the Miami Dolphins.
 Brian Waltrip, professional soccer player in Norway, Finland, and Portugal.
 Roman Reigns, professional wrestler for WWE, and former professional Canadian football player. (attended, but graduated from Escambia High School)
 Jeremy Reaves, free safety for the Washington Commanders.

References

External links 
 

Roman Catholic Diocese of Pensacola–Tallahassee
Catholic secondary schools in Florida
Buildings and structures in Pensacola, Florida
High schools in Escambia County, Florida
Educational institutions established in 1941
1941 establishments in Florida